Cotton Green is a suburb of Mumbai, and a noted residential and commercial area east of Parel, in central Mumbai, 8 km north of Colaba. It is also the name of a railway station on the Mumbai suburban railway, which lies along the Harbour line, which is a part of the Central Railway.

There was an earlier Cotton Green in Colaba that is marked in old maps. That location is now part of Badhwar Park. Cotton was shipped from this location as recently as 1910.

Etymology
The station is named Cotton Green after an Art Deco building of the "Cotton Exchange" and a series of warehouses. The older Cotton Green in Colaba was thus named because it was in a village green and housed the original cotton exchange.

One more possibility is as follows. The station is named Cotton Green after an Art Deco building of the "Cotton Exchange" and a series of warehouses. The older Cotton Green in Colaba was thus named because it was in a village green and housed the original cotton exchange. In the 18th century the area around the only English church (Today's St. Thomas Church at Fort, Bombay (Mumbai)) was situated on what is called as the Green, a spacious area that continued from the Fort thereto, and was pleasantly laid out in walks planted with trees. The area was naturally called ‘Bombay Green’. Due to the area's proximity to the docks and the piled bales of Cotton for trade thereat, it came to be referred as ‘Cotton Green’. In 1844, cotton trade was shifted from this area to further south at Colaba. The new locality came to be called rather predictably as ‘New Cotton Green’. Subsequently, due to further remodeling and reclamation, the cotton trade at  ‘New Cotton Green’ was shifted to ‘Sewri-Mazgaon’ reclamation area, where a spacious Cotton Exchange Building was also built. The Rail Station opposite this Cotton Exchange Building was for obvious reasons named "Cotton Green".

History 

The Cotton Exchange Building was built in 1924 and used for trading in Cotton until 1945. The building originally was in a minty green colour, today it stands tall in beige and brown around the edges and has been fully restored to its former glory. The building is a stunning example of engineering and has not needed any maintenance except replacement of glass windows which are shattered by cricket balls as children play cricket on roads around the building.

Overview
The railway station caters to the area called Kalachowki, Ferbandar and Ghodapdeo. Kalachowki is a big residential area consisting of a colony called Abhyudaya Nagar which has 43 MHADA-built (Maharashtra Housing and Area Development Authority) housing, intended those who worked in the textile mills in the area.

The colony has now turned into prime residential and commercial property, and is no longer owned by MHADA. Because of its proximity to Mumbai's prime central areas such as Dadar (15-minute drive) and Parel, Lower Parel and Worli (20–25 minutes' drive)

Kalachowki also has another big colony called Labour Docks, which also belonged to MHADA.

This area saw the development of numerous high-rise apartments (going up to 30 floors).

References

External links
 History of Colaba and Cuffe Parade

Neighbourhoods in Mumbai